Osmo C. Smith (January 28, 1912 – July 6, 1949) was an American football player and coach. He served as the head football coach at Jacksonville State University–then known as Jacksonville State Teachers College–in 1940. Smith was a three-time letter winner at Auburn University from 1936 to 1938.

Head coaching record

References

External links
 

1912 births
1949 deaths
American football quarterbacks
Auburn Tigers football players
Jacksonville State Gamecocks football coaches
High school football coaches in Alabama
People from Lee County, Alabama
Players of American football from Alabama
Coaches of American football from Alabama